TXF may refer to: 
 The X-Files, an American science fiction television series
 The X Factor (TV series), a television music talent show franchise
 Transactional NTFS, a component of Windows Vista and later operating systems